Multani is a Unicode block containing characters used for writing the Multani alphabet, a Brahmic script used in the Multan region of Punjab and in northern Sindh in Pakistan.  The script is now obsolete, but was historically used to write the Saraiki language.

History
The following Unicode-related documents record the purpose and process of defining specific characters in the Multani block:

References 

Unicode blocks
Saraiki language